Riccardo Brugnara (born 26 December 1993 in Mantua, Lombardy) is an Italian prop who plays for Rugby Calvisano in the Italian Top12, previously he played for Leicester Tigers in the Premiership and has played on loan for Doncaster in the Championship.

Brugnara joined Tigers' Academy after attending a rugby course run by Bob Dwyer in his native Italy.

In 2018 he was named Additional Player for  Benetton Rugby. For 2019–20 Pro14 and 2020–21 Pro14 seasons he also named as Permit Player for Zebre.

In 2016 and 2018 Brugnara was named in the Emerging Italy squad for the World Rugby Nations Cup.

See also
 Riccardo Brugnara's Stats in Premiership on premiershiprugby.com, Premier Rugby Ltd.
 Leicester Tigers deals after the club's development group on bbc.com/sport
  It's Rugby France Profile

References

Sportspeople from Mantua
Living people
1993 births
Rugby union props
Italian rugby union players
Leicester Tigers players
Italy A national rugby union team players